is an area in Tokorozawa, Saitama Prefecture, Japan.

Namiki houses the Tokyo Area Control Center.

Transportation

Railway 
 Seibu Railway - Seibu Shinjuku Line

 

Tokorozawa, Saitama